Spinasteron is a genus of spiders in the family Zodariidae. It was first described in 2003 by Baehr. , it contains 19 Australian species.

Species
Spinasteron comprises the following species:
Spinasteron arenarium Baehr, 2003
Spinasteron barlee Baehr, 2003
Spinasteron casuarium Baehr, 2003
Spinasteron cavasteroides Baehr & Churchill, 2003
Spinasteron knowlesi Baehr, 2003
Spinasteron kronestedti Baehr, 2003
Spinasteron lemleyi Baehr, 2003
Spinasteron longbottomi Baehr, 2003
Spinasteron ludwigi Baehr & Churchill, 2003
Spinasteron mjobergi Baehr, 2003
Spinasteron nigriceps Baehr, 2003
Spinasteron peron Baehr, 2003
Spinasteron ramboldi Baehr & Churchill, 2003
Spinasteron sanford Baehr, 2003
Spinasteron spatulanum Baehr & Churchill, 2003
Spinasteron waldockae Baehr, 2003
Spinasteron weiri Baehr, 2003
Spinasteron westi Baehr, 2003
Spinasteron woodstock Baehr, 2003

References

Zodariidae
Araneomorphae genera
Spiders of Australia